The 1st Army Division, formerly the Northern Army Detachment, is a unit of the Peruvian Army.

History

First founded as a Region, its headquarters were relocated by Luis Miguel Sánchez Cerro's administration from Lambayeque to Piura in 1930. It was then reorganized under Manuel Prado's administration and renamed as the Northern Army Detachment in January 1941, under the command of then General Eloy Ureta. After hostilities broke out with Ecuador on July of the same year, the division took on a major role during the conflict, carrying out an offensive on the Ecuadorian coast.

In the 1960s, the unit was again renamed to the 1st Military Region, and again in 2003 as the Northern Military Region. In 2012, by Legislative Decree No. 1137 “Peruvian Army Law”, the military regions again became army divisions. As a result, the unit's name was again changed to its current one.

The division's coat of arms features a Sun of May and other features that represent certain elements of the division.

Organization
The 1st Army Division is formed by the following units:
1st Infantry Brigade
1st Cavalry Brigade
Artillery Group
6th Jungle Brigade
7th Infantry Brigade
32nd Infantry Brigade
9th Armored Brigade
1st Services Brigade

See also
2nd Army Division
3rd Army Division
4th Army Division
5th Army Division

References

Military units and formations of Peru